Rosebud was the name of an American popular music group which released a single, eponymous album in 1971. 

Its members were Judy Henske, Jerry Yester, Craig Doerge, John Seiter, and David Vaught. The album was a follow-up to the Henske-Yester collaboration, Farewell Aldebaran.  Perhaps to its detriment, Rosebud was seen as a democratic enterprise, with all band members contributing songs and singing, broadly in a countryish soft rock style—rather than making the best use of Henske's remarkable voice and songwriting abilities. Following its release and a couple of live shows, the band split up, Henske and Yester divorced, and she and Doerge married.  

Yester is credited as the producer of their lone album. The LP was released on the Straight/Reprise label; the album was rereleased on CD in 2004  by Collectors' Choice Music, and again in 2017 with bonus tracks by Omnivore Recordings.

Yester, Henske, and Doerge have continued to produce and record music, and Judy Henske (1936-2022) returned to the studio and toured as well.

Rosebud album track listing
 "Panama"
 "Le Soleil"
 "Reno"
 "Western Wisconsin"
 "Lorelei"
 "Salvation"
 "Lullabye II"
 "The Yum Yum Man"
 "Roll Home Cheyenne"
 "Flying to Morning"
2017 CD reissue bonus tracks:
"Lazy"
"Reno" (Mono Single Version)
"Mercury of Fools"
"Hey Old Friend" (Judy Vocal)
"Le Soleil" (Demo)
"What's The Matter With Sam"
"Easy On Me, Easy"
"Father of Souls"
"Mercury of Fools" (Demo)
"Hey Old Friend" (Jerry Vocal, Demo)

External links
LINER NOTES FOR ROSEBUD'S ROSEBUD, Article by Richie Unterberger
[ Biography by Richie Unterberger], Allmusic entry

American pop music groups